The Miss Universe Canada 2016 pageant was held on June 11, 2016. Siera Bearchell was crowned as the winner and represented Canada in the Miss Universe 2016 pageant.

Final results

Special Awards

Order of Announcement

Top 5 
 Southwest Toronto
 Amherstburg
 Etobicoke
 Atlantic Canada
 Saskatchewan Province

Top 12 
 Etobicoke
 Pacific Canada
 Southwest Toronto
 North Calgary
 Atlantic Canada
 South Ontario
 Saskatchewan Province
 Thunder Bay
 South Edmonton
 Vancouver
 Oakville
 Amherstburg

Top 20 
 Vancouver
 North Calgary
 Richmond Hill
 Alberta Province
 North Ontario
 West Ontario
 Oakville
 Southwest Toronto
 Etobicoke
 Pacific Canada
 Iroquois Falls
 Amherstburg
 Central Canada
 Saskatchewan Province
 Thunder Bay
 British Columbia Province
 South Edmonton
 Atlantic Canada
 Saskatoon
 South Ontario

Official Delegates
Meet the national delegates competing for the title of Miss Universe Canada 2016:

References

External links
Official Website

2016
2016 in Toronto
2016 beauty pageants